The 2013–14 Purdue Boilermakers women's basketball team will represent Purdue Boilermakers during the 2013–14 NCAA Division I women's basketball season. The Boilermakers, led by eighth year head coach Sharon Versyp, play their home games at the Mackey Arena and were a members of the Big Ten Conference. They finished with a record of 22–9 overall, 11–5 overall for a tie for a fourth-place finish. They lost in the quarterfinals of the 2014 Big Ten Conference women's basketball tournament to Iowa. They were invited to the 2014 NCAA Division I women's basketball tournament which they defeated Akron in the first round before losing to Oklahoma State in the second round.

Roster

Schedule

|-
!colspan=9 | Exhibition

|-
!colspan=9| Regular Season

|-
!colspan=9 | 2014 Big Ten Conference women's basketball tournament

|-
!colspan=9 | NCAA women's tournament

Source

Rankings

See also
 2013–14 Purdue Boilermakers men's basketball team

References

Purdue Boilermakers women's basketball seasons
Purdue
Purdue